Palaios Panteleimonas is a mountain village of the former municipality of East Olympos, which is part of the municipality of Dio-Olympos, in the Pieria regional unit, Central Macedonia, Greece.

Palaios Panteleimonas is located 43 km from Katerini and it is just 6 km from the village and beach of Neos Panteleimonas, where there are also many possibilities for accommodation, dining, entertainment and tourist information. The view of the Thermaikos Gulf from the area, is unique. The path to the village and the surrounding area is rich of fauna of the lower Mount Olympus, with forest of chestnut, oak and arbutus.
You can also watch the summer of cultural events of the International Olympus Festival of Castle of Platamon.

The access is made via the National Highway and the railway station of Neoi Poroi.

Nearest places
Neos Panteleimonas
Beach of Panteleimon
Neoi Poroi
Platamon

See also
Castle of Platamon

References
Παλαιός Παντελήμονας

Populated places in Pieria (regional unit)
Pieria (regional unit)